Suzanne Elizabeth Heywood, Baroness Heywood of Whitehall (née Cook; born 25 February 1969) is a British executive and former civil servant. She has been managing director of the Exor Group since 2016 and chair of CNH Industrial since 2018. She is Chairperson at Iveco Group.

Having sailed around the world with her family as a child, she studied at Somerville College, Oxford and King's College, Cambridge. Her early career was spent as a civil servant in HM Treasury. She then joined McKinsey & Company, where she rose to become a senior partner before leaving for Exor in 2016.

Early life and education
Suzanne Cook was born on 25 February 1969 in Southampton, England to Gordon Cook and Mary Cook (née Brindley). From 1976 to 1986, she sailed around the world with her family in a schooner called Wavewalker. In 1977, while recreating Captain Cook's third voyage, the ship was almost destroyed in a storm between Africa and Australia. She was below deck and received a serious head injury, but the rest of her family and crew received only minor injuries; her father had been the only one on deck and was thrown overboard but was saved by his lifeline. She undertook her secondary education through the Queensland Correspondence School, completing both the Junior Certificate and the Senior Certificate.

Having returned to dry land, she matriculated into Somerville College, Oxford in 1987 to study zoology. Her college tutor was Marian Dawkins. She graduated from Oxford with a Bachelor of Arts (BA) degree in 1990. She then moved to the University of Cambridge, where she was a member of King's College, Cambridge, to undertake postgraduate studies. She completed her Doctor of Philosophy (PhD) degree in 1993: her thesis was titled "Filial imprinting in chicks: processes and stimulus representations".

Career
In 1993, Heywood joined Her Majesty's Treasury as a fast stream trainee. In 1995, after two years of training, she was appointed private secretary to the Financial Secretary to the Treasury. From 1996 to 1997 she was a Grade 7 civil servant.

In 1997, Heywood left the civil service and moved into the private sector, joining McKinsey & Company as an associate. She became a partner in 2007. She was made director (senior partner) in 2013 when she was appointed Global Head of the Organisation Design Service Line. She left McKinsey & Company in 2016 to join the Exor Group as managing director of which she was later appointed Chief Operating Officer in November 2022. She has additionally been chair of CNH Industrial since July 2018. Additionally, she has served as interim CEO of CNH Industrial since March 2020, following the resignation of Hubertus Mühlhäuser. As Deputy Chair of Trustees she became Acting Chair of the Royal Opera House from December 2019 until July 2020. Heywood is also on the board of the Covent Garden Foundation, Chanel Ltd., The Economist Group Ltd. and the Royal Academy of Music.

Personal life
In 1997, the then Suzanne Cook married Jeremy Heywood. Jeremy was a senior civil servant, who was Cabinet Secretary and Head of the Home Civil Service until shortly before his death in 2018. Together they had three children, including twins.

In 2017, Heywood wrote a biography of her mother-in-law, the archaeologist Brenda Swinbank.

In 2021, Heywood spoke out in defence of her late husband, following criticisms made in Nigel Boardman's review of the Lex Greensill affair.

Selected works

References

1969 births
Living people
British business executives
British women business executives
Heywood of Whitehall
Civil servants in HM Treasury
Businesspeople from Southampton
Alumni of Somerville College, Oxford
Alumni of King's College, Cambridge
Spouses of life peers
Wives of knights
McKinsey & Company people